Wakefield City F.C. was an English football club.

History
The club were members of the Yorkshire League in the 1920–21 season before joining the Midland League. After finishing second bottom of the Midland League they returned to the Yorkshire League. They resigned in 1928.

They also competed in the FA Cup in 1907 and 1921, reaching the 2nd Qualifying Round in the latter campaign.

References

Defunct football clubs in England
Defunct football clubs in West Yorkshire
Midland Football League
Yorkshire Football League